The 1842 Brighton by-election was held on 5 May 1842 after the resignation of the incumbent Whig MP Isaac Newton Wigney.  The seat was gained by the Conservative MP Lord Alfred Hervey.

References

By-elections to the Parliament of the United Kingdom in Sussex constituencies
May 1842 events
Politics of Brighton and Hove
1842 elections in the United Kingdom
1842 in England
19th century in Sussex